Martyna Kotwiła (born 13 January 1999) is a Polish sprinter. She won a bronze medal at the 2018 World U20 Championships. In 2018, she ran 22.99 in the 200 metres breaking the long-standing Polish junior record previously held by Irena Kirszenstein.

International competitions

1Did not finish in the semifinals

Personal bests
Outdoor
100 metres – 11.52 (+0.3 m/s, Słubice 2018)
200 metres – 22.99 (+2.0 m/s, Lublin 2018)
Indoor
60 metres – 7.43 (Toruń 2018)
200 metres – 23.39 (Toruń 2023)

References

1999 births
Living people
Polish female sprinters
People from Radom
Polish Athletics Championships winners
20th-century Polish women
21st-century Polish women
European Athletics Championships medalists